Coleophora azishtella is a moth in the family Coleophoridae. It is found in Russia.

References

azishtella
Moths described in 1998
Moths of Asia